Doa cubana is a moth of the Doidae family. It is found on Cuba.

External links
Lepidoptera (Insecta) De Topes De Collantes, Sancti Spíritus, Cuba

Doidae
Endemic fauna of Cuba